Haziyapur is a village of Aligarh district of Uttar Pradesh, India. It was established about 150 years ago. It is situated about 1 km from the district Secretariat.

References

Villages in Gopalganj district, India